Joe Billy McDade (born 1937) is a senior United States district judge of the United States District Court for the Central District of Illinois, with chambers in Peoria, Illinois. He is the first judge of the newly created seat, and was appointed by President George H. W. Bush.

Education and career

Born in Bellville, Texas, McDade received a Bachelor of Science degree in Economics, with Honors, in 1959, and a Master of Science in Psychology in 1960, both from Bradley University. While at Bradley, McDade was part of the All-NIT Basketball Team in 1957 and 1959 as a member of the Bradley University NIT Championship team. He earned a Juris Doctor from University of Michigan Law School in 1963.

McDade was a staff attorney in the United States Department of Justice Antitrust Division in Chicago from 1963 to 1965. He was an executive trainee at the First Federal Savings and Loan Association of Peoria, Illinois in 1965. He was executive director of the Greater Peoria Legal Aid Society from 1965 to 1968. He was in private practice in Peoria from 1968 to 1982: first as a partner in Hafele & McDade, P.C., until 1977, then in solo practice until his election as a state judge in 1982.

Judicial service
He was an Associate Circuit Judge, Tenth Judicial Circuit, State of Illinois, from 1982 to 1988, then a Circuit Judge, Tenth Judicial Circuit, State of Illinois, from 1988 to 1991.

McDade was nominated by President George H. W. Bush on September 11, 1991, to the United States District Court for the Central District of Illinois, to a new "temporary" seat created by the Federal Judgeship Act of 1990, part of the Judicial Improvements Act of 1990; he was confirmed by the United States Senate on November 21, 1991, and received his commission on November 25, 1991. He served as Chief Judge of the court from 1998 to 2004. McDade took senior status on February 28, 2010. He has been a member of the Illinois State Bar Association General Assembly.

Personal life

Joe McDade's wife, Mary, is also a judge: she has been a justice of the Illinois Appellate Court since December 2000. They have four children.

See also 
 List of African-American federal judges
 List of African-American jurists
 List of first minority male lawyers and judges in Illinois

References

Sources

1937 births
Living people
People from Bellville, Texas
African-American basketball players
African-American judges
Basketball players from Texas
Bradley Braves men's basketball players
Cincinnati Royals draft picks
Illinois state court judges
Judges of the United States District Court for the Central District of Illinois
People from Peoria, Illinois
United States Department of Justice lawyers
University of Michigan Law School alumni
United States district court judges appointed by George H. W. Bush
20th-century American judges
American men's basketball players
21st-century American judges